Vasha may refer to:
Vaşa, Azerbaijan
Vasheh, Markazi, Iran